Malur is a town and taluk headquarters in Kolar district of the Indian state of Karnataka. It is 30 km from Kolar, the district headquarters, and about 25 km from Bangalore. It is accessible from Bangalore by road and railways. The Chennai Central-Bangalore City line passes through Malur, with trains to various parts of India, including Tirupati, Chennai, Kochi, Trivandrum, Patna and Calcutta.

Geography
It has a Tropical wet and dry climate, similar to Bangalore. It has summer temperatures rarely crossing 37°C, and winter temperatures rarely falling below 15°C.

Demographics
 India Census, Malur had a population of 40,050.  Males constitute 20,337 of the population and females 19,673.  Malur has an average literacy rate of 82.47% higher than the state average of 75.36% : male literacy is 87.40%, and female literacy is 77.36%. In Malur, 4,589 that is 11.46% of the population is under 6 years of age.

Kannada is the major language spoken in Malur, while Telugu is also considerably spoken and Tamil to a small extent. Malur lies just 15km away from the Tamil Nadu border, and 55km from the Andhra Pradesh border.

Economy
The economy of Malur is primarily dependent on business and it is famous for clay tile-and-brick industry and some small-scale industries. Eucalyptus plantations are common. Vegetables and millets are the main crop grown, largely beans and tomatoes, as well as  ragi and maize. This region is one of the largest producers of ragi in India. Flowers are also grown widely and are exported to large cities. 
Another source of income in Malur are brick kilns, their products being exported to Chennai and Bangalore.
It is a major industrial centre, with  factories like Honda Motor Cycle Limited, Mahindra Aerospace, Scania AB, Medinova and some other factories. There is a lot of employment available, with labourers from other parts of Karnataka, Tamil Nadu, Andhra Pradesh, Telangana, Maharashtra. The number of labourers from North India are also increasing with better accessibility. Challenges being faced include bonded labour, especially in brick kilns. Poultry farming is also common on an industrial scale.

Culture
Malur was once called Malligepura. Jasmine flowers are cultivated widely in it. A famous temple is situated in Chikka Tirupati, which means "small Tirupati" in Kannada. Karaga is a major festival in Malur. The festival is celebrated in Malur exactly a week after it happens in Bangalore.

Notable people
 Masti Venkatesha Iyengar, writer

References

Cities and towns in Kolar district